Joseph I Adam Prince of Schwarzenberg (15 December 1722, Vienna – 17 February 1782, Vienna), 4th Prince of Schwarzenberg, was a German-Bohemian nobleman.

Biography
Joseph I was born as the son of Adam Franz Karl, 3rd Prince of Schwarzenberg and Eleonore von Schwarzenberg (1682–1741).

When he was 10, his father was killed in a hunting accident and he nominally succeeded his father and became the 4th Prince of Schwarzenberg and a Knight in the Order of the Golden Fleece. He was K.u.K. Chamberlain, Geheimrat, Obersthofmeister of Empress Maria Theresa and, finally, Staats- und Konferenzminister. 

Joseph I of Schwarzenberg married on 22 August 1741 in Mariaschein near Teplice, Maria Theresia von und zu Liechtenstein (28 December 1721 - 19 January 1753), the daughter of Joseph Johann Adam, Prince of Liechtenstein and Maria Anna von Oettingen-Spielberg. Soon afterwards he and his wife built the church in Postelberg, out of gratitude for the birth of an heir. In 1767 Joseph I bought the Neuschloss estate.

On 5 December 1746 for Bohemia and on 8 December 1746 for the Holy Roman Empire, Joseph I of Schwarzenberg received the prince's diploma, extended to the effect that all marital male and female descendants were allowed to use the title “prince” or “princess” and was thus raised to the rank of imperial prince and the status of a Bohemian prince.

Children
Joseph of Schwarzenberg fathered four sons and five daughters:
Johann I. Nepomuk Anton (3 July 1742 – 5 October 1789), 5th Prince of Schwarzenberg
Maria Anna (6 January 1744 – 8 August 1803), married in 1764 to Ludwig von Zinzendorf
Josef Wenzel (26 March 1745 – 4 April 1764)
Anton (11 April 1746 – 7 March 1764)
Maria Theresa (30 April 1747 – 21 January 1788), married to Siegmund von Goëss
Marie Eleonore (13 May 1748 – 3 May 1786)
Franz Josef (8 August 1749 – 14 August 1750)
Maria Josepha (24 October 1751 – 7 April 1755)
Marie Ernestine (18 October 1752 – 12 April 1801), married to Franz Xaver von Auersperg

Sources
 BLKÖ:Schwarzenberg, Joseph Adam Johann Nepomuk Fürst

1722 births
1782 deaths
18th-century Austrian people
Austrian Empire politicians
Joseph I Adam
Bohemian nobility
German Bohemian people
Nobility from Vienna
Obersthofmeister